The flag of Republika Srpska within Bosnia and Herzegovina was adopted on 24 November 1992. The flag is a rectangular tricolour with three equal horizontal bands of red, blue and white. It is almost identical to the civil flag of Serbia, but with different aspect ratio of 1:2 instead of 2:3 and slightly different color shades.

While the Constitutional Court of Bosnia and Herzegovina declared the coat of arms of Republika Srpska unconstitutional, claiming that it did not represent the non-Serb ethnicities living in the entity, the flag was deemed to be in line with the constitution. The court ruled that though the combination of the colours relates to the Serbian tricolor, the use of red, blue and white are considered to be pan-Slavic colors as well.

Related flags

The Serb tricolor has been used as the basis for other flags, most notably as Serbia's national flag. Montenegro has also used the Serbian tricolor with varying shades of blue. Under communist Yugoslavia, the republics of Serbia and Montenegro had flags of same design and colors. Montenegro changed its flag in 1993 by altering the proportion and shade of blue in its flag and used this flag until 2004.

The Serbian tricolor was also the basis for the Republic of Serbian Krajina. The Serbian tricolor defaced with a Serbian cross is used as the flag of the Serbian Orthodox Church.

The Republika Srpska's flag is popular among many Bosnian Serbs and they prefer to fly it or the Serbian flag instead of the Bosnian national flag.

Colours scheme

Gallery

Standards

See also

Flag of Bosnia and Herzegovina
Flag of the Federation of Bosnia and Herzegovina
Flag of the Republic of Serbian Krajina

References

Republika Srpska 
Flag
Republika
Flags introduced in 1992